Jan Nikolaevich Spielrein (14/26 June 1887 – 21 January 1938) was a Soviet scientist in the field of Mathematics, professor, Member of the USSR Academy of Sciences.

Biography 
He was born in 1887 in the Rostov-on-Don.

Spielrein was educated in Rostov-on-Don. In 1907 he graduated from the Department of Physics and Mathematics of the University of Sorbonne, in 1911 the Higher Polytechnic School in Karlsruhe. Since 1911 Spielrein was an assistant professor at the University of Stuttgart.

In the second half of 1918 he returned from Germany to Russia, taught at the Krasnodar Polytechnic Institute. In 1920–1921 Spielrein worked in the Bureau of Foreign Science and Technology in Moscow. Since 1921, he holds the post of professor of the electrical engineering faculty of the Moscow Higher Technical School.

In 1930, Spielrein joined the newly formed Moscow Power Engineering Institute. Until the end of his life he was a professor, head of the department of higher mathematics, dean of the general and electrophysical faculties of the Moscow Power Engineering Institute.

His field of research was the application of vector calculus, tensor analysis and other mathematical methods in electrical engineering, heating engineering and radio engineering. He was also the author of the first handbook in the USSR on special functions in engineering calculations, one of the first to introduce a vector presentation in the course of theoretical mechanics.

Spielrein was arrested on September 10, 1937 and sentenced to the death penalty by the Supreme Soviet of the Soviet Union on January 21, 1938, on charges of participating in the Democratic Party. He was executed by a firing squad at the Kommunarka shooting ground on the same day. On February 4, 1956 Spielrein was rehabilitated.

Literature 
 Jean Spielrein. Lehrbuch der Vektorrechnung nach den Bedürfnissen in der technischen Mechanik und Elektrizitätslehre. Stuttgart: Konrad Wittwer, 1916. 
 Jean Spielrein. Vectorrechnung: Lehrbuch der vektorrechnung nach den bedürfnissen in der technischen mechanik und elektrizitätslehre. 2 verb. und verm. Aufl. Mit 62 textabbildungen und einer formelsammlung. Stuttgart: Verlag von Konrad Wittwer, 1926. — 434 s.
 Векторное исчисление. Руководство для инженеров и физиков. М.—Л.: Госиздат, 1925. — 324 стр.
 Современные математические методы в применении к вопросам электротехники и теплотехники. М.-Л.: Объединённое научно-техническое издательство, Главная редакция энергетической литературы, 1936.

References 

Academic staff of Moscow Power Engineering Institute
Soviet mathematicians
Corresponding Members of the USSR Academy of Sciences
People executed by the Soviet Union by firing squad
1887 births
1938 deaths
Scientists from Rostov-on-Don
University of Paris alumni
Academic staff of the University of Stuttgart
Soviet rehabilitations
Great Purge victims